Detlef Hofmann (born 12 November 1963 in Karlsruhe) is a German sprint canoeist who competed from the late 1980s to the late 1990s. He won a gold medal in the K-4 1000 m event at the 1996 Summer Olympics in Atlanta.

Hofmann won five medals at the ICF Canoe Sprint World Championships with three golds (K-4 500 m: 1991, K-4 1000 m: 1995, K-4 10000 m: 1991) and two silvers (K-4 500 m: 1995, K-4 1000 m: 1991).

In May 1992, Hofmann was caught for doping after testing positive for testosterone and kicked off the team. He would return after the 1992 Summer Olympics to compete.

References
 
 
 
 
New York Times article on doping prior to the 1992 Summer Olympics featuring Hofmann.

Wallechinsky, David and Jaime Loucky (2008). "Canoeing: Men's Kayak Fours 1000 Meters". In The Complete Book of the Olympics: 2008 Edition. London: Aurum Press Limited. pp. 477–8.

External links
 
 

1963 births
Canoeists at the 1996 Summer Olympics
Doping cases in canoeing
German male canoeists
German sportspeople in doping cases
Living people
Olympic canoeists of Germany
Olympic gold medalists for Germany
Olympic medalists in canoeing
ICF Canoe Sprint World Championships medalists in kayak
Medalists at the 1996 Summer Olympics
Sportspeople from Karlsruhe